The riverside wren (Cantorchilus semibadius) is a species of bird in the family Troglodytidae. It is found in Costa Rica and Panama.

Taxonomy and systematics

The riverside wren has sometimes been treated as conspecific with bay wren (Cantorchilus nigricapillus) but their plumages are quite different as are DNA analyses. The species is monotypic.

Description

The adults have a bright orange-brown crown; chestnut nape, back, and rump; and a blackish tail with buff-white bars. They have a black-over-white supercilium and the rest of the face is streaked and spotted black and white. From throat to vent their underparts are pale gray with narrow black bars; the gray becomes somewhat buffy to the rear. Juveniles are duller overall, have fine black scaling on the crown, and the underparts' black bars are not as crisp.

Distribution and habitat

The riverside wren is found along the Pacific slope from Costa Rica's Gulf of Nicoya into western Panama. It inhabits dense vegetation, preferably along watercourses, swampy edges of woodlands, or on steep precipices.

Behavior

Feeding

The riverside wren forages near the ground, usually in pairs or family groups. It sometimes briefly joins other species at army ant swarms. Its diet includes insects and other invertebrates.

Breeding

The riverside wren appears to nest at almost any time of the year. Its nest is globular made of fine fibers; it drapes over a branch to form two chambers with an entrance hole in the outer one. The species also constructs "dormitory" nests for roosting. The clutch size is two.

Vocalization

Both sexes of riverside wren sing, repeated "loud ringing phrases" and followed by different phrases, also repeated. Their calls include "harsh churr and various clear tinkling notes".

status

The IUCN has assessed the riverside wren as being of Least Concern. However, its "population trend is difficult to determine because of uncertainty over the impacts of habitat modification on population sizes."

References

Further reading

riverside wren
Birds of Costa Rica
Birds of Panama
riverside wren
riverside wren
Taxonomy articles created by Polbot
Isthmian–Pacific moist forests